Richard Cox (born May 6, 1948) is an American actor. He is known for his roles as Stuart Richards in the film Cruising and Max Frazier on Ghostwriter. He was nominated for Broadway's 1979 Tony Award as Best Actor (Featured Role - Musical) for Platinum.

Career
Cox performed on Broadway with Ingrid Bergman in Captain Brassbound's Conversion before going to Hollywood in 1975 with the national company of Grease.
 
He appeared with Al Pacino in Cruising (1980) and Looking for Richard (1996). Other film credits include Seizure (1974), Between the Lines (1977), Sanford and Son (1975), King of the Mountain (1981), Hellhole (1985), The Vindicator (1986), Zombie High (1987) and Radio Free Albemuth (2010).

He can also be seen playing a terrorist fighting for independence in the Star Trek episode "The High Ground" (1990).

Filmography

Film

Television

External links

 
 

1948 births
Living people
American male film actors
American male stage actors
Place of birth missing (living people)
American male television actors